Cheshmeh Nush (also Romanized as Cheshmeh Nūsh and Chashmeh Nūsh) is a village in Gowdin Rural District, in the Central District of Kangavar County, Kermanshah Province, Iran. At the 2006 census, its population was 254, in 50 families.

References 

Populated places in Kangavar County